La Coupo Santo (The Holy Cup), in full La Cansoun de la Coupo (The song of the Cup) in original modern (or Mistralian) norm Provençal (in classical norm, La Copa Santa in full Lo Cant de la Copa Santa (The song of the Holy Cup) or La Cançon de la Copa (The Song of the Cup)) is the anthem of Provence. It is sung in Provençal, one of six Occitan dialects.

It refers to a silver chalice the Catalan félibres offered their Provençal counterparts on July 30, 1867 during a Banquet held in Avignon to thank them for hiding Victor Balaguer, a poet from Barcelona who'd sought political asylum out of Spain. The cup was made by Guillaume Fulconis and the silversmith Jarry.

The cup is traditionally entrusted to the capolièr, who presides over the Félibrige. It is showcased every year at the society's annual congress, called la Santa Estèla. The banquet is officially closed when the Copa Santa gets sung. It was initially written by Frédéric Mistral to commemorate the fraternal bond that unites the Occitan and Catalan nations, and the music was taken from a Christmas carol from Friar Serapion: Guilhaume, Tòni, Pèire. It stands among the best-known anthems of Occitania alongside Se Canta and De cap tà l'immortèla. The audience is supposed to stand up for the last verse.

Description
Frédéric Mistral described the cup with these words in L'Armana prouvençau:
It is a cup of antique shape, supported by a palm tree. Against the palm tree, standing up and facing each other, two gentle figurines that depict Catalonia and Provence as sisters.
Provence wraps its right arm around her friend's neck, as a token of amity; Catalonia holds her right hand on her heart and seems to be thanking her.
At the bottom of each figurine, dressed in the Latin manner and with their breasts naked, lie their respective coat of arms in an escutcheon.
Around the cup and outside it, written on a braid intertwined with laurels, the following words can be read (in Catalan):
"Souvenir offered by the Catalan Patricians to the Provençal Félibres for the hospitality given to the Catalan poet Victor Balaguer, 1867."
And on the pedestal these other finely engraved inscriptions can be found:
"They say it is dead,
But to me, it's still alive.
V. Balaguer
Ah! if only they could hear me!
Ah! if only they would follow me!
F. Mistral"

Lyrics

Notice: For both norms of Provençal orthography, pronunciation is almost the same.

References

External links
  & (Occitan) Access to lyrics, music sheet, and MIDI file
 Notreprovence.fr in English

Wikisource
 Copa Santa

Copa Santa
Provence-Alpes-Côte d'Azur
French anthems
Occitan music
National anthem compositions in F major
Frédéric Mistral